Kalaat Beni Abbes (L-474) is an amphibious transport dock of the Algerian National Navy.

The ship has a continuous flight deck with two deck-landing spots for helicopters at the bow and stern.

Ordered in 2011, the ship was commissioned by the Algerian National Navy on 4 September 2014. The first official docking - and commissioning ceremony - was on 28 March 2015 in the presence of the Chief of Staff of the ANP and the High Command of the Algerian National Navy.

The 2021 Algerian-Israeli naval incident took place near this ship. It deployed two Superlynx anti-submarine warfare helicopters to detect an intruder Israeli submarine while Algerian submarines surrounded it and chased it away.

Capabilities 
The ship has an opening dock to the rear which allows it to launch up to three landing craft. The port side of the ship has davits which are able to launch three landing craft, and two fast boats for commandos. The ship also houses a garage for 15 heavy tanks and housing for 440 soldiers plus 150 crew. The ship also carries a 60-bed hospital and operating theaters.

The ship is continuously assisted by three craft also built by Fincantieri, named Chaland, which can each carry a heavy tank or a maximum of 140 personnel.

Weapon systems 
The ship is fitted with an EMPAR radar for detecting long-range threats, and 16 Aster 15 missiles in two vertical A-50 launchers, as well as a 76 mm turret and two Oerlikon KBA 25x137 mm cannons that can be used for defence against aircraft or surface targets. The vessel also has a complete electronic warfare suite provided by Thales and Elettronica, linked to two SCLAR-H Oto-Melara decoy launchers.

References 

2014 ships
San Giorgio-class amphibious transport docks
Ships of the Algerian National Navy
Landing craft
Helicopter carriers
Ships built by Fincantieri